Mantua Township  is one of the eighteen townships of Portage County, Ohio, United States.  The 2000 census found 4,661 people in the township.

Name and history
Mantua Township was named in commemoration of Mantua, Italy, which in 1796 was besieged by Napoleon, during the Napoleonic Wars.

It is the only Mantua Township statewide.

Government
The township is governed by a three-member board of trustees, who are elected in November of odd-numbered years to a four-year term beginning on the following January 1. Two are elected in the year after the presidential election and one is elected in the year before it. There is also an elected township fiscal officer, who serves a four-year term beginning on April 1 of the year after the election, which is held in November of the year before the presidential election. Vacancies in the fiscal officership or on the board of trustees are filled by the remaining trustees.

Geography
It is located in the northern part of Portage county and borders the following townships and cities:
Auburn Township, Geauga County - north
Troy Township, Geauga County - northeast corner
Hiram Township - east
Freedom Township - southeast corner
Shalersville Township - south
Streetsboro - southwest corner
Aurora - west
Bainbridge Township, Geauga County - northwest corner

The village of Mantua, which became independent of the township in 1993, is located in what was previously southern Mantua Township and borders the township on three sides.

Mantua Bog State Nature Preserve and Marsh Wetlands State Nature Preserve, are located east of Mantua. Both are part of the Mantua Swamp region which was designated as a National Natural Landmark in 1976.

Notable people
 Eliza Roxcy Snow Smith, an early Latter Day Saint leader, and a plural wife of both Joseph Smith and Brigham Young
 Lorenzo Snow, a former president of the Church of Jesus Christ of Latter-day Saints.  The community of Mantua, Utah, in Utah's Box Elder County, was named in honor of Snow and his hometown.

References

External links

Townships in Portage County, Ohio
Townships in Ohio